is a Pokémon species in Nintendo and Game Freak's Pokémon media franchise. It is first introduced in Pokémon Sword and Shield, directed by Shigeru Ohmori. Wooloo is a friendly Normal-type sheep-like Pokémon from the Galar region, which is based on the United Kingdom. Wooloo has appeared in the anime: in the main series, and the web miniseries Pokémon: Twilight Wings. Wooloo has received positive reviews and has been regarded as the cutest Pokémon in Pokémon Sword and Shield.

Concept and characteristics
Wooloo is a Normal-type sheep-like Pokémon from the Galar region. Its dark body is mostly covered in a fluffy white fleece, with only its head, legs, horns and tail visible. Its ears poke behind gray strings of wool that resemble braided pigtails. Wooloo's fleece functions as a cushion, allowing it to survive even a fall from a cliff without any injuries. The fleece grows continuously throughout Wooloo's life, and it will grow back in just three months after completely shaved. If Wooloo's fleece grows too long, it will be unable to move. The fleece is popular as a specialty product in Galar, being used for clothing and carpets. Wooloo live in herds and are known to mimic the actions of their herd leader or Trainer. They have a friendly disposition and dislike conflict, and can escape from enemies by simply rolling away.

Appearances
Wooloo is first introduced in Pokémon Sword and Shield.

In anime
A Trainer's Wooloo has appeared in a flashback of Sword and Shield: From Here to Eternatus!. Later on in the show, Hop is revealed to own a Wooloo when introduced in the Masters 8 tournament. Hop tried to battle Ash using a Wooloo only to get easily defeated by Pikachu's Iron Tail in one hit.

In Pokémon: Twilight Wings, Wooloo debuted in the episode "Letter", as it appeared under the ownership of Hop. Wooloo reappeared in "Training", where it was seen watching TV with its Trainer. It appeared again in "Buddy", where it became jealous of Hop's appreciation of Leon's Charizard, and ran away from home. By the time of "The Gathering of Stars", Hop's Wooloo had evolved into Dubwool.

Reception
Wooloo proved popular with fans, with many of them creating fan art of it. Michael McWhertor of Polygon described Wooloo as "perfect in every way". Game director Shigeru Ohmori said that "it definitely caught [him] by surprise just how popular it became". Kotaku, GamesRadar, GameSpot, GameRevolution and Screen Rant all described Wooloo as an adorable sheep Pokémon, and one of the cutest Pokémon. Janet Garcia of IGN saw it as the cutest Pokémon from Sword and Shield, stating, "I don’t know if there’s such a thing as a perfect Pokémon but this might be it." Tumblr’s year-end gaming lists of 2019 included a newly added category for the most buzzed about Pokémon, which puts Wooloo in second place, right behind Pikachu. According to Amanda Brennan, head of content insights on Tumblr, the category was added specifically because of the popular response regarding Wooloo on the website. Julia Lee of Polygon also described Wooloo as the best Pokémon of the decade, stating that "I want to bury my face in the Wooloo wool."

After Wooloo's major role in the Pokémon: Twilight Wings episode "Buddy", Robert Adams of GameRevolution has claimed that "Wooloo memes are the best new thing about Twilight Wings." Patricia Hernandez of Polygon mentions that "the fluffy sheep-like creature is definitely cute" and that the short "humanizes" Wooloo, and Austin Wood of GamesRadar said that Wooloo in the episode is "the cutest and exceedingly adorable."

PETA made a controversial statement on Twitter about sheep shearing depicting Wooloo. The organization later received criticism and backlash from Pokémon fans for spreading misinformation about sheep shearing.

A variety of merchandise depicting Wooloo has been made such as plushes, figurines, and toys.

References

External links
 Wooloo on Bulbapedia
 Wooloo on Pokemon.com

Fictional sheep
Pokémon species
Video game characters introduced in 2019
Nintendo protagonists
Video game memes
Internet memes introduced in 2020